Georgy Khachaturovich Martirosyan (January 31, 1948, Rostov-on-Don) is a  Soviet and Russian film, stage and voice actor, Honored Artist of the Russian Federation (2004).

Selected filmography
 Missing Expedition (1975) as Tikhon
 D'Artagnan and Three Musketeers (1978) as cardinal's guardsman  
 Pirates of the 20th Century (1980) as Klyuev
 The Suicide Club, or the Adventures of a Titled Person (1981) as servant
 Along Unknown Paths (1982) as hero
 The Treasures of Agra (1983) as King of Bohemia
 TASS Is Authorized to Declare... (1984) as KGB officer
 Charlotte’s Necklace (1984) as Sedov
 The Most Charming and Attractive (1985) as customer in a restaurant
 Aelita, Do Not Pester Men! (1988) as companion 
 Genius (1991) as Mormon 
 Love in Russian (1995) as Gavrilov
 Poor Sasha (1997) as Colonel
 Voroshilov Sharpshooter (1999) as prosecutor
 The President and His Granddaughter (2000) as salon director
 My Fair Nanny (2004) as Boris Shtorm
 I'm Staying (2007) as singer Yuri Zatonsky
 Election Day (2007) as singer
 Radio Day (2008) as Sasha's uncle
 Voronin's Family (2018) as Valery Olegovich Nesterov

References

External links

   Georgy Martirosyan at the KinoPoisk
 Георгий Мартиросян: Мне очень хотелось набить морду Никите Джигурде!

1948 births
Living people
Russian male actors
Soviet male film actors
Russian male film actors
Soviet male stage actors
Russian male stage actors
Soviet male voice actors
Russian male voice actors
Honored Artists of the Russian Federation
Actors from Rostov-on-Don
Russian people of Armenian descent